Jörg Schneider (born 14 May 1964) is a German politician for the Alternative for Germany (AfD) and since 2017 member of the Bundestag.

Life and politics

Schneider was born 1956 in the West German town of Solingen and studied mechanical engineering at the Helmut Schmidt University.
Schneider entered the newly founded populist AfD in 2013 and became a member of the Bundestag after the 2017 German federal election.

References

1964 births
People from Solingen
Members of the Bundestag for North Rhine-Westphalia
Living people
Helmut Schmidt University alumni
Members of the Bundestag 2021–2025
Members of the Bundestag 2017–2021
Members of the Bundestag for the Alternative for Germany